Sultan Suyindikuly Abilgazy (Sūltan Süiındıkūly Äbılğazy; born 22 February 1997) is a Kazakhstani footballer who plays as a centre-back for Elimai.

Career
Abilgazy made his professional debut in the Kazakhstan Premier League for Okzhetpes on 2 October 2016, coming on as a substitute in the 76th minute for Zhakyp Kozhamberdi against Astana, with the away match finishing as a 0–3 loss.

References

External links
 Sultan Abilgazy at FootballFacts.ru
 
 

1997 births
Living people
Sportspeople from Kokshetau
People from Kokshetau
Kazakhstani footballers
Kazakhstan youth international footballers
Kazakhstan under-21 international footballers
Association football central defenders
FC Okzhetpes players
FC Tobol players
Kazakhstan Premier League players
Kazakhstan First Division players